The Ogilvie Institute is a college in the Catholic Diocese of Aberdeen, in Scotland, that specialises in part-time and distance-learning courses of religious education and formation, catechesis and theology for adults.

The institute has close working relationships with both the Open University and Maryvale Institute.

External links
 Ogilvie Institute Web site

Education in Aberdeen
Bible colleges, seminaries and theological colleges in Scotland
Catholic Church in Scotland
Distance education institutions based in the United Kingdom